Veralipride (Agreal, Agradil) is a typical antipsychotic of the benzamide class. It is indicated for the treatment of vasomotor symptoms associated with menopause. It is a D2 receptor antagonist and it induces prolactin secretion without any estrogenic or progestagenic effects. It was first authorised for use in 1979. Veralipride has never gained approval in the United States.

The women who took it, in addition to parkinsonism, were produced by Parkinson's at a very early age, a much more aggressive Parkinson's that progressed much faster and produced death at a very early age. It has also produced other serious effects such as tumors, depression, dementia, etc, etc. For this reason, its sale ceased despite the fact that the Sanofi laboratory knew of the serious side effects it produced and allowed healthy women to continue taking it for years after (even years later its sale was allowed in Mexico after having been banned in all countries for almost 15 years). Europe a medicine that was never approved by the United States)

In September 2006, it was withdrawn from the Spanish market. As a result, the European Commission referred the matter to the European Medicines Agency (EMA). In July 2007, the EMA recommended the withdrawal of marketing authorisations for veralipride.

See also 
 Typical antipsychotic
 Benzamide
 Levosulpiride

References 

Allyl compounds
Benzamides
Pyrrolidines
Sulfonamides
Withdrawn drugs
Typical antipsychotics